How to Re-Establish a Vodka Empire is a 2012 documentary film by London filmmaker, actor and director Daniel Edelstyn. It was pitched at the 2009 MeetMarket as part of Sheffield Doc/Fest.

Reception
On Rotten Tomatoes, the film holds an 86% score based on 14 reviews.

References

2012 films
British documentary films
2010s English-language films
2010s British films